Minuscule 821 (in the Gregory-Aland numbering), Cι60 (von Soden), is a 16th-century Greek minuscule manuscript of the New Testament on paper, with a commentary.

Description 
The codex contains the text of the Gospel of John, with a commentary, on 281 paper leaves (size ).

The text is written in one column per page, 30 lines per page.

The same manuscript contains also a catena to the Book of Genesis (folios 1-261).

Text 
Kurt Aland did not place the Greek text of the codex in any Category.

History 

C. R. Gregory dated the manuscript to the 16th century. It has been assigned to the 16th century on palaeographic grounds by the Institute for New Testament Textual Research.

It was added to the list of New Testament manuscripts by Gregory (821e).

The manuscript is housed at the Biblioteca Nacional de España (4673, fol. 262-542) in Madrid.

See also 

 List of New Testament minuscules
 Biblical manuscript
 Textual criticism
 Minuscule 822
 Minuscule 823

References

Further reading 

 

Greek New Testament minuscules
16th-century biblical manuscripts